Gia Aleksandrovich Grigalava (born 5 August 1989) is a Georgian professional footballer who plays for Russian club Arsenal Tula. He also holds Russian citizenship.

Career
The Russian-Georgian started his career at FC Rostov, who made his debut in the Russian Premier League in 2007. In January 2010 SKA Rostov loaned the left-back to FC Rostov for one season and returns after six years to his youth club. Since April 2009 and until December 2009 he was on loan at FC Moscow.

In February 2015, Grigalava tested positive for banned substances. On the 12th of the same month, Grigalava was released by Anzhi.

International career
Grigalava was a part of the Russia U-21 side that was competing in the 2011 European Under-21 Championship qualification.

Career statistics

Notes

References

External links
 
 

1989 births
People from Kutaisi
Georgian emigrants to Russia
Living people
Russian footballers
Russia under-21 international footballers
Footballers from Georgia (country)
Georgia (country) international footballers
Association football defenders
FC Rostov players
FC SKA Rostov-on-Don players
FC Moscow players
FC Volga Nizhny Novgorod players
PFC Krylia Sovetov Samara players
FC Anzhi Makhachkala players
Pafos FC players
Ethnikos Achna FC players
FC Arsenal Tula players
FC Khimki players
Russian First League players
Russian Premier League players
Cypriot First Division players
Expatriate footballers from Georgia (country)
Expatriate sportspeople from  Georgia (country) in Cyprus
Expatriate footballers in Cyprus